Richard Orville Richards (November 17, 1907 – November 13, 1996) was an American football player. He played college football at Kentucky and professional football in the National Football League (NFL) as a fullback and wingback for the Brooklyn Dodgers. He appeared in nine NFL games, four as a starter, during  the 1933 season.

References

1907 births
1996 deaths
Kentucky Wildcats football players
Brooklyn Dodgers (NFL) players
Players of American football from Colorado